The Gun Digest is an annual firearms book published in the United States by Gun Digest Media. Gun Digest is owned by Caribou Media, LLC. In addition to the annual book, the company releases several volumes a year focused on firearms collecting, self-defense and various firearm models as well as a 16 issue per year print magazine, a television show called Modern Shooter and website, Gundigest.com.

History
Gun Digest was first published in 1944 and included articles written by well-known writers such as Jack O'Connor and Major Charles Askins. The annual volume includes firearms reviews, listings of manufacturers and a price guide of current firearm values.

Phil Massaro was named Editor-in-Chief in January 2020. 

As well as the annual book, there are several editions for specific types of firearms, such as the AR-15, the .22 Rimfire, Shotguns, Assault Weapons and firearm values. Other books specific to gunsmithing, Cowboy Action shooting and other topics are offered by authors such as John Taffin, Massad Ayoob, Dan Shideler, Bill Loëb and Patrick Sweeney.

Magazine
The Gun Digest began publishing a magazine in 2006 entitled Gun Digest the Magazine, which evolved from a tabloid-style gun classifieds newspaper named Gun List. It contained the same firearm classifieds and auction listings, but the new periodical features articles and columns on firearms, shooting, gunsmithing, reloading, collecting and legislation. It is published 16 times a year in a magazine format.

Several other magazines have been published by Gun Digest such as Gun Digest's Tactical Gear, edited by Kevin Michalowski.

References

External links
 

Business magazines published in the United States
Biweekly magazines published in the United States
Firearm books
Firearms magazines
Magazines established in 2006
Magazines published in Wisconsin